Rail transport in France is marked by a clear predominance of passenger traffic, driven in particular by high-speed rail. The SNCF, the national state-owned railway company, operates most of the passenger and freight services on the national network managed by its subsidiary SNCF Réseau. France currently operates the second-largest European railway network, with a total of 29,901 kilometres of railway.

The first railway line in the country opened in 1827 from Saint-Étienne to Andrézieux. The network has undergone a major modernization since 1981 with the arrival of the TGV high-speed rail service which has been consistently expanded in subsequent years.

In 2017, there were 1.762 billion journeys on the French national rail network, among which 1.270 billion on SNCF services and 493 million on RATP sections of the RER, the express regional network operating in the Paris area which is shared between both companies. The Paris suburban rail services represents alone 82% of the French rail annual ridership.

With a total of 100.2 billion passenger-kilometres, France has the fifth-most used passenger network worldwide, and second-most used in Europe after that of Russia. France is a member of the International Union of Railways (UIC). The UIC country code for France is 87.

At the same time, only 9% of French cargo is shipped via railway, or about ½ of the European average, and only a small fraction when compared to certain countries.

National and regional services (TER) are complemented by an important network of urban railways which is still rapidly growing. Six cities are served by metro systems (Lille, Lyon, Marseille, Paris, Rennes and Toulouse), while 31 metropolitan areas are additionally served by tram networks, among which 23 were inaugurated in the 21st century.

France was ranked 7th among national European rail systems in the 2017 European Railway Performance Index for intensity of use, quality of service and safety performance, a decrease from previous years.

History 

In 1814, the French engineer Pierre Michel Moisson-Desroches proposed to the Emperor Napoleon to build seven national railways from Paris, in order to travel "short distances within the Empire".

However, the history of railways in France really begins in 1827, when the first trains operated on the Saint-Etienne to Andrezieux Railway, the first French line, granted by order of King Louis XVIII in 1823.

Exploitation
Since  of 1842, French railways are highly focused on Paris.

Traffic is concentrated on the main lines: 78% of activity is done on 30% of the network (8,900 km), and the 46% of smaller lines (13,600 km) only drive 6% of the traffic. The 366 largest stations (12%) account for 85% of passenger activity, and the smallest 56% of stations take only 1.7% of traffic.

Freight transport 
Freight transport has declined since the early 1980s. Today the network is predominantly passenger-centric; railways transport only 9% of French cargo, or about 1/2 of the European average, and less than a fourth of the US railways' share of US cargo.

Since 1 January 2007, the freight market has been open to conform to European Union agreements (EU Directive 91/440). New operators had already reached 15% of the market at the end of 2008.

Passenger transport

Short and middle distance 
The Transport express régional (TER) is directed by the administrative Regions of France. They contract with the SNCF for lines exploitation.

Long distance 
The SNCF directly manage this class of trains. The TGV is used on the most important destinations, while Intercités carriages are still used for other lines.

Network 

1,500 V is used on the south, and HSR lines and the northern part of the country use 25 kV electrification.

Trains drive on the left, except in Alsace and Moselle where tracks were first constructed while those regions were part of Germany.

Rail links to adjacent countries 
 Same gauge
 Belgium —  voltage change 25 kV AC/3 kV DC (except high-speed line to Brussels, same voltage)
 Germany —  voltage change 25 kV AC/15 kV AC
 Italy —  voltage change 25 kV AC or 1.5 kV DC/3 kV DC
 Luxembourg —  same voltage
 Monaco —  same voltage
 Spain via the LGV Perpignan-Figueres — same voltage
 Switzerland — voltage change 25 kV AC or 1.5 kV DC/15 kV AC 
 United Kingdom via the Channel Tunnel —  voltage change 25 kV AC/750 V DC third rail (except high-speed line to London, same voltage)
 Break-of-gauge, /
 Spain (on conventional tracks) — voltage change 1.5 kV DC/3 kV DC
 No rail link to Andorra
 No rail links from Saint Martin to Sint Maarten or from French Guiana to Suriname or Brazil

Current status

The French non-TGV intercity service (TET) is in decline, with old infrastructure and trains. The French government is planning to remove the monopoly that rail currently has on long-distance journeys by letting coach operators compete.

Travel to the UK through the Channel Tunnel has grown in recent years, and from May 2015 passengers have been able to travel direct to Marseille, Avignon and Lyon. Eurostar is also introducing new Class 374 trains and refurbishing the current Class 373s.

The International Transport Forum described the current status of the French railways in their paper "Efficiency indicators of Railways in France":

 The success of the TGV is undeniable (Crozet 2013). Work started in September 1975 on the first high-speed rail (HSR) line, between Paris and Lyon, and it was inaugurated in September 1981. New high-speed lines were opened in 1989 (towards the south-west), in 1993 (towards the north), etc. The high-speed network extent was 2,600 km in 2017, after the opening of four new lines.
 The regionalisation of intercity and local services was tested in 1997 and fully deployed in the early 2000s. Since then, TERs (regional express trains) have seen traffic rise steeply (50% between 2000 and 2013) as, to a lesser extent, have services in the Ile de France region (25%).
 Rail freight has been far less successful. The French network carried 55 billion tonne-km in 2001, but this figure scarcely reached 32 billion tonne-km in 2013. This weak performance contrasts sharply with the ambitious public policy of the last fifteen years. The Grenelle Environment Forum (2007–2010) oversaw the deployment of a costly freight plan that was no more effective than its predecessors.

Subsidies
Like roads, the French railways receive rail subsidies from the state in order to operate. Those amounted to €13.2 billion in 2013.

Material 
Alstom is  the manufacturer of the  TGV, and is behind many regional train models (Régiolis, SNCF Class Z 26500 ... )

See also
Transport in France
Narrow gauge railways in France
Rail transport in Europe
Rail transport by country

References

External links 

RFF – Réseau Ferré de France. Updated in June 2007